Valentine Pelka (born 23 February 1956) is an English actor who has starred in film and on television.

Biography
Pelka was born in Dewsbury, West Riding of Yorkshire, to a Polish civil engineer father and an Irish actress mother, and attended St Michael's College, Leeds (now part of Mount St Mary's Catholic High School, Leeds). His sister, Kazia, is an actress who starred on Brookside, among other television programmes.

He has made guest appearances on Highlander: The Series as Kronos, an enemy of Duncan MacLeod (Adrian Paul) and former acolyte of Methos (Peter Wingfield) in the episodes "Comes a Horseman", "Revelations 6:8", "Archangel" and "Not To Be". He starred in the 1986 TV series Crossbow (UK, William Tell) as Roland.

He also guest starred in the 1990 TV series Zorro in the episode "All that Glitters" which preceded his starring role as the military governor, Colonel Montoya, in the 2000 syndicated TV series Queen of Swords. Peter Wingfield also co-starred as Dr Robert Helm. The part of Montoya was written for Pelka by executive producer David Abramowitz who in October 1999 offered him the part subject to approval by the other show producers.

In 1999, he appeared in the British TV soap opera Family Affairs as Simon Thornton. His sister, Kazia, was also a leading player in Family Affairs; however, that was after Valentine had appeared in the soap opera. Of the feature films in which Valentine has performed, the best-known was Roman Polanski's 2002 film The Pianist. His supporting comedic role in Under the Tuscan Sun was performed mute. He returned to stage work in 2013 when he reprised his role as John Lennon in Sandy Marshall's biopic And in the End at the Jeremy Street Theatre in London.

Also in 1999, he had a guest starring role in Highlander: The Raven as Andre Korda, an immortal who is a criminal and once trained the main character Amanda. The episodes were 'The French Connection' and 'A Matter of Time'.

Family
He is married and has one child.

Filmography
Ivanhoe (TV Series) - Maurice De Bracy
Pope John Paul II (1984) (TV) – Boguslaw Banas
Sakharov (1984) (TV) – Efrem Sakharov
King David (1985) – Shammah
Monsignor Quixote (1985)
If Tomorrow Comes (1986) – Gino
Robin of Sherwood (1986) (TV) – Sarak
Nanou (1986) – Jacques
Hold the Dream (1986) (TV) – Winston Harte
William Tell (1987) (TV) – Roland
Rowing with the Wind (1988) – Percy Bysshe Shelley
Zorro (1990) (TV episode) – Leonardo Montez
The Plant (1995) (TV) – Max
Heartbeat (British TV series) (1995) Series 5 Ep 14 - Danny
First Knight (1995) – Sir Patrise
Highlander: The Series (TV) (1996–1998) – Kronos / Ahriman / Koren
What Rats Won't Do (1998) – Graham
The Chewing Gum and Mrs. Andrews (1999) (short film)
The Last of the Blonde Bombshells (2000) (TV) – Leslie
Life Force - (2000) (TV) Richard Webber
Sabotage! (2000) – Prussian hussar
Queen of Swords (2000–01) (TV series) – Col. Luis Montoya
The Pianist (2002) – Dorota's Husband 
Under the Tuscan Sun (2003) – Jerzy
Prime Suspect 6 (2003) (TV) – SO19 Commander
Lie With Me (2004) (TV) – Alex
Egypt (2005) (TV) – Pierre Lacau
8mm 2 (2005) – Gorman Bellec
Ultimate Force (2006) (TV) - Col. Bundarczuk 
Fake Identity (2008) – Matthew Murdoch
Come Fly With Me (2011) (TV) – Polish Ambassador Dubrovsky
I Spit on Your Grave 2 (2013) – Father Dimov
The Power (2015) – Del
Zavtrak u papy (2016)

References

External links

1956 births
English male film actors
English people of Irish descent
English people of Polish descent
English male television actors
Living people
Male actors from Yorkshire
People educated at Mount St Mary's Catholic High School, Leeds
Actors from Dewsbury